Abbadia a Isola is a village in Tuscany, central Italy, administratively a frazione of the comune of Monteriggioni, province of Siena. At the time of the 2001 census its population was 136.

Abbadia a Isola is about 20 km from Siena and 4 km from Monteriggioni.

Main sights 
 Abbey of Santi Salvatore e Cirino

References 

Frazioni of Monteriggioni